The Usa is a river that is  long in Hesse, Germany. It is right tributary of the Wetter, which it joins at the outskirts of Friedberg. Its source is in the Taunus mountains, near the town Neu-Anspach. The principal towns along the river are Usingen, Bad Nauheim and Friedberg.

Tributaries

The following rivers are tributaries to the river Usa (from source to mouth):

Left: Ansbach, Arnsbach, Schleichenbach, Stockheimer Bach, Eschbach, Dittenbach, Michelbach, Detzelbach, Forbach, Fauerbach

Right: Heisterbach, Schlichenbach, Röllbach, Wiesbach, Holzbach, Vogelthal-Bach, Aitzenbach, Hainbach, Deutergraben, Seebach

See also
List of rivers of Hesse

References

Rivers of Hesse
Rivers of the Taunus
Rivers of Germany